The Newark Bears (also known as the Joe Fays) were an American basketball team based in Newark, New Jersey that was a member of the American Basketball League.

For the 1934/35 season the team was renamed the Newark Mules. For the 2nd half of that season, the team merged with the New Britain Jackaways to become the New Britain Mules on January 18, 1935.

Year-by-year

Basketball in Newark, New Jersey
Basketball teams in New Jersey
1933 establishments in New Jersey
1935 disestablishments in New Jersey
Basketball teams established in 1933
Sports clubs disestablished in 1935